João Batista Donizete Dressler Burse (born 10 June 1982) is a Brazilian professional football coach and former player.

A central defender, he spent most of his playing career in Brazil, as well as brief spells in Japan and Chile.

Playing career
Born in Estiva Gerbi, São Paulo, Burse was a Mogi Mirim youth graduate. Promoted to the first team in 1999, he played for the club until 2002, and subsequently represented Nagoya Grampus, Corinthians Alagoano, União Barbarense and the under-23 side of Universidad Católica. He retired at the age of 24 due to a serious pubis injury.

Coaching career
After retiring, Burse joined his first club Mogi Mirim as a fitness coach of the under-15s. He was later appointed head coach of the category, and subsequently was in charge of the under-20s.

On 29 January 2014, Burse was appointed head coach of Vitória's under-17 squad. On 17 September of the following year, he was named at the helm of Palmeiras' under-20 team.

Sacked by Verdão on 16 May 2017, Burse returned to Vitória on 20 September and took over the under-20s. Ahead of the 2018 campaign, he was also at the helm of the under-23s.

On 31 July 2018, after Vágner Mancini's dismissal, Burse was named interim coach of the main squad. He returned to his previous role on 14 August, after the appointment of Paulo César Carpegiani.

On 6 November 2018, Burse was again named interim for the remaining six matches of the season, replacing sacked Carpegiani. After the club's relegation, he returned to his previous role.

On 22 October 2019, Burse was named head coach of Cianorte for the upcoming campaign. He left the club on 22 March 2022, and returned to Vitória on 19 June, now named first team coach of the side in the Série C.

Burse led Vitória to promotion in the 2022 Série B, but was dismissed on 5 February 2023 after a poor start into the new season.

References

Honours

Coach
Mogi Mirim
 Campeonato Paulista Sub-20: 2013

Palmeiras
  Campeonato Bellinzona- Suíça Sub-19: 2016

Vitória
 Campeonato Baiano Sub-17: 2015
 Copa do Brasil Sub-17: 2015
 Copa do Nordeste Sub-20: 2017
 Acesso para a série B do Brasileiro Profissional: 2022

External links

1982 births
Living people
Footballers from São Paulo (state)
Brazilian footballers
Association football defenders
Mogi Mirim Esporte Clube players
Sport Club Corinthians Alagoano players
União Agrícola Barbarense Futebol Clube players
Nagoya Grampus players
Club Deportivo Universidad Católica footballers
Brazilian expatriate footballers
Brazilian expatriate sportspeople in Japan
Brazilian expatriate sportspeople in Chile
Expatriate footballers in Japan
Expatriate footballers in Chile
Brazilian football managers
Campeonato Brasileiro Série A managers
Campeonato Brasileiro Série C managers
Campeonato Brasileiro Série D managers
Esporte Clube Vitória managers
Cianorte Futebol Clube managers